UoS or UOS may refer to:

Union of students, also known as students' union, a student organisation present at many universities
Union of Salvation
Unity Operating System or Unified Operating System, Chinese Linux Distribution
Franklin County Airport (Tennessee)

Universities

Asia 

 University of Sahiwal, a public university in Pakistan
 University of Sargodha, a public university in Pakistan
 University of Seoul, a public university in South Korea
 University of Sharjah, a university in United Arab Emirates
 University of Sindh, a public university in Pakistan

Europe 

 University of Salford, a university in Northern England
 University of Sheffield, a university in Northern England
 University of Southampton, a university in Southern England
 University of Suffolk, a university in Eastern England
 University of Surrey, a university in Southeastern England
 University of Sussex, a university in Southern England
 University of Stuttgart, a university in Southern Germany

North America 
University of Saskatchewan, a Canadian coeducational public research university, founded in 1907